The 28th New Brunswick Legislative Assembly represented New Brunswick between March 9, 1893, and September 1895.

Samuel Leonard Tilley served as Lieutenant-Governor of New Brunswick until September 1893, when he was replaced by John Boyd. John James Fraser became lieutenant-governor after Boyd's death in December of that year.

John Percival Burchill was chosen as speaker.

The Liberal Party led by Andrew G. Blair formed the government. However, Blair was defeated in his own riding and was forced to run in a by-election in Queen's.

The province's Legislative Council was abolished in 1892.

History

Members 

Notes:

References 
  Results of the provincial elections in New Brunswick, New York Times, October 24, 1892
The Canadian parliamentary companion, 1897, JA Gemmill

Terms of the New Brunswick Legislature
1892 establishments in New Brunswick
1895 disestablishments in New Brunswick
19th century in New Brunswick